HMS Bramble was a  (officially, "fleet minesweeping sloop") of the Royal Navy, which was commissioned in 1939, just prior to World War II. During the war she served as a minesweeper in the North Sea, and then on Russian convoys until sunk in the Battle of the Barents Sea on 31 December 1942 by the German cruiser Admiral Hipper and the destroyer Friedrich Eckoldt.

Service history
The ship was ordered on 11 August 1937 from HM Dockyard Devonport, with engines supplied by Barclay Curle. She was laid down on 22 November 1937, and launched on 12 July 1938. After sea trials in July 1939 Bramble was assigned to the 1st Minesweeping Flotilla at Portland Harbour, sailing with the Flotilla to Scapa Flow in August. She served as a minesweeper in the North Sea until February 1941, when she transferred to Harwich for operations in the Thames Estuary.

In April 1941 she was transferred to Western Approaches Command for Atlantic convoy escort duty, and attached to the 3rd Escort Group. Between 22 July 1941 and 16 November 1942 she was commanded by Captain John Crombie. In October she was detached to serve on the Russian convoys, and joined Convoy PQ 2 sailing to Arkhangelsk, where she remained carrying out local minesweeping and patrol duties, as well as escorting in- and out-bound convoys. She returned to the UK in January 1942 to be refitted at a yard in Sunderland. She returned to convoy duty in April, returning to Russia with Convoy PQ 15. She served there until October, when she returned to the UK to be repaired at a shipyard in the Humber.

Sinking
On 22 December 1942 Bramble sailed with Convoy JW 51B from Loch Ewe. On 31 December Bramble, which had been detached to search for stragglers, was returning to the convoy when she encountered Admiral Hipper and three destroyers. Hipper promptly opened fire with her  guns. Bramble returned fire but was overwhelmed and finally sunk with all hands by the destroyer  in position .

Convoys
Bramble served on the following convoys between the UK and Russia, prefixed PQ, with returning convoys prefixed QP:

References

External links
 
 
 

 

1938 ships
Ships built in Plymouth, Devon
Halcyon-class minesweepers
World War II minesweepers of the United Kingdom
Maritime incidents in December 1942
Warships lost in combat with all hands